Nazi Billionaires: The Dark History of Germany's Wealthiest Dynasties  is the English title of a book by Dutch historian David de Jong about German industrialists who profited from the government during the Nazi era.

Reception 
The book received favorable reviews by  The New York Times, The Wall Street Journal, The Times, The Economist and The Spectator.

See also 
 The Silence of the Quandts

References 

Books about Nazi Germany